Olga Loera (born Olga Lidia Loera Martinez) is a Mexican-American glamour model who has modeled for editorial photo shoots, commercial advertising campaigns, as well as in film and television. She has also worked as a celebrity hair stylist and makeup artist.

Career 
Loera has worked as a celebrity beautician on photoshoots, fashion shows, film sets as well as a stylist in radio and television. In 2001 she put together a team of make up artist and hair stylist and founded Team Indulge. It was in this capacity that Olga first came to work for Playboy, doing hair and makeup at the Playboy Mansion for playmates like Holly Madison, Kendra Wilkinson, and Tina Marie Jordan. It was at this point Loera decided to once again pursue a career in modeling. In January 2013 she was named Playboy Mexico's Cyber Girl of the Month and once again in December of the same year. She has held the title of Mrs. Latina Global 2013 and also sat as a judge in the competition. In 2014 she was a named a spokesmodel for Dama Tequila and Spearmint Rhino International. In April 2014, she was named Playboy Mexico's Playmate of the Month. She was featured on the cover of StipLV Magazine's July 2014 issue. In February 2015, Olga was named Playboy Venezuela's Playmate of the Month. in July 2015 she appeared on the cover of Lowrider Magazine. In September 2015, Loera was featured in the pages of Mexico Chilanga Surf. In 2017, her photos with Thierry Brouard made the Cover and Centerfold of Playboy Mexico and Playboy Slovakia. She was the first Playmate in America to be painted by fine artist Olivia de Berardinis, an official Playboy artist. Olga Loera currently is affiliated and sponsored by:
 
Sponsored Brands: 
Alani Nutritional sports drink
Chlorophyl water
Tragos Amargo
Casa Azul
Boxer

Fashion Brands:
Fashion nova
Stori Athletic 
Catwalk
For the Star Fashion House
Comic Con
April Black Diamond
Bunnies Room

Magazine Publications:
Playboy in 9 states Italy, Sweden, Mexico, Russia
Maxim Slovakia and Check
Ocean drive Miami
Amaré Magazine 
Low Rider magazine
Strip Las Vegas magazine
Perpetual Magazine Life and Style

Televion Series:
Bravo Tv for the real OC House wives coming out November 
National Geographic two episodes

Olga Loera breaking the stereotype, petite bombshell transformed, the way making it looks like through carving her own path. Born and raised in Mexico, Loera came from humble beginnings. Loera never faltered in the face of adversity. Olgas fierce spirit kept her curious and fearless when it cam to exploring novel places and ideas. Loera Is proud of her heritage and is living proof that you can live the life others can only dream about. The truth of the matter is it takes courage to break the mold of what box other try to put you. Olga's drive comes from within. The number one influence over her life that showed her the balance between strength and grace is her beautiful mother. Olga continues to break barriers in the name of her two daughters to be an example of what hard work and dedication looks like. Loera has a passion for caring for others and leading the way to all women within her industry. When speaking to Olga about what her idea of women empowerment means to her "a strong unity of women, one power" Olga focuses on the positive and setds her intentions every day by drawing out the "white noise" by doing what moves her. "citation AMARE Magazine 2022 page 58.

Olga Loera

References

Living people
2010s Playboy Playmates
Mexican female models
Hispanic and Latino American Playboy Playmates
1987 births
21st-century Mexican women